Ziarat is a district in the north of Balochistan province of Pakistan. Ziarat town (situated at an altitude of about 2,400 meters) is headquarters of the district of the Sub division, and also of the tehsil.

Administration
Ziarat District was established in July 1986, previously being part of Sibi District. The district, with a population of 52855, is subdivided into two tehsils Ziarat and Sanjawi the latter is the most densely populated having a population of 32,456, while Ziarat Tehsil has a population of 18,000. The district contain a total of ten Union Councils.

Demography
At the time of the 2017 census the district had a population of 160,095, of which 82,161 were males and 77,912 females. Rural population was 156,703 (97.88%) while the urban population was 3,392 (2.12%). The literacy rate was 45.36% - the male literacy rate was 58.84% while the female literacy rate was 31.43%. 417 people in the district were from religious minorities. Pashto is the predominant language, spoken by 97.61% of the population.

Tourism
Ziarat has some of the oldest Juniper forests in the world. A tourist destination, the economy of the district also benefits from orchards of apples and cherries. The Ziarat district has the highest Human Development Index of all districts in the province. The first Governor-General of Pakistan, Muhammad Ali Jinnah, spent last days of his life in Ziarat Residency in Ziarat.

Notable people
Arman Loni
Wranga Loni

References

Bibliography

External links

 Ziarat District at www.balochistan.gov.pk
 Ziarat District at www.balochistanpolice.gov.pk
 Ziarat District Development Profile 2011

 
Districts of Pakistan
Districts of Balochistan, Pakistan.